The 2007 Kentucky elections for the statewide offices of governor, lieutenant governor, attorney general, auditor of public accounts, commissioner of agriculture, secretary of state, and state treasurer were held on November 6, 2007. All incumbents were reelected with the exception of incumbent governor Ernie Fletcher, who was defeated in his reelection bid for governor by former Lieutenant Governor Steve Beshear. In addition, Democrats held the open Attorney General and State Treasurer posts.

This election was historically significant in that it marked the first time since 1915 that a Republican had won statewide office in an election won by a Democratic gubernatorial candidate. Incumbent Republicans Trey Grayson and Richie Farmer won reelection as Secretary of State and Commissioner of Agriculture respectively.

Races

Governor and lieutenant governor

Incumbent Republican Ernie Fletcher and his running mate, Robbie Rudolph, faced off against the Democratic slate of former Lt. Governor Steve Beshear and State Senator Dan Mongiardo.

Attorney general
The seat left open by Democrat Greg Stumbo, who made a failed bid for Lt. Governor, was contested by Democrat Jack Conway and Republican State Representative Stan Lee.

Results

Auditor of public accounts
Incumbent Democrat Eugenia Crittenden Blackburn "Crit" Luallen was elected in 2003 with 50.8% of the vote. Her 2003 opponent, Linda Greenwell, staged a second campaign for the seat. A Research 2000 poll conducted in October showed Luallen garnering 55% of the vote, compared to Greenwell's 33%.

Results

Commissioner of agriculture
Incumbent Republican and former University of Kentucky basketball star Richie Farmer was elected in 2003 with 55.2% of the vote. He was challenged by Democrat David Lynn Williams. Farmer was shown to have a 54-35 lead over Williams in an October Research 2000 poll.

Results

Secretary of state
Incumbent Republican Trey Grayson was elected in 2003 with 52.5% of the vote. He was challenged by the former Mayor of Pineville, Democrat Bruce Hendrickson. Grayson held a narrow 45-39 lead over Hendrickson in a Research 2000 poll conducted in October.

Results

State treasurer
Two-term incumbent Democratic Jonathan Miller made a failed run for governor in 2007, leaving this seat open. The candidates who contested this office were Democrat Todd Hollenbach IV, an attorney, and Republican Melinda Wheeler, the director of the Administrative Office of the Courts for Kentucky court system. Hollenbach led Wheeler 51-36 in a Research 2000 poll conducted in October.

Results

References

 Source: DC's Political Report: Kentucky Congressional and Statewide Races 
 Source: Kentucky Online Registrar Directory

External links
 Kentucky State Board of Elections -- 2007 General Election Results

Campaign Websites
 Steve Beshear for Kentucky Governor
 Jack Conway for Kentucky Attorney General
 Vote Richie Farmer on November 6
 Fletcher/Rudolph 2007
 Trey Grayson: Secretary of State for Kentucky
 Linda Greenwell for Auditor of Public Accounts
 Hendrickson for Secretary of State
 Todd Hollenbach for Kentucky State Treasurer
 Stan Lee for Attorney General
 Crit Luallen for Auditor 
 Melinda Wheeler - Candidate for Kentucky State Treasurer

 
Kentucky